Hard Contract is a 1969 American drama mystery film written and directed by S. Lee Pogostin and starring James Coburn and Lee Remick.  It premiered on April 30, 1969 in Panavision.

Plot synopsis
CIA assassin John Cunningham (James Coburn), a cold-blooded killer with nerves of steel and no conscience, kills a man on election day, votes in the local election and spends the rest of the afternoon with Ellen (Karen Black), a prostitute. The next day, Cunningham goes to see James Ramsey (Burgess Meredith), his mobilizer, a CIA man whose cover is a job as a college physics professor.

Ramsey offers one final, lucrative job, or "hard contract" as he calls it, that can allow Cunningham to retire from the business for good. This consists of three hits, two in Spain and Belgium, with the last victim to be revealed after the first two are dispatched.

On his way to Spain to make the first hit, Cunningham meets two women in Tangier who will change his life: American tourist and jet setter Sheila Metcalfe (Lee Remick), and her naive but good-hearted friend, socialite Adrianne (Lilli Palmer).

He does kill the first two victims, but later, as remorse slowly takes hold over him, Cunningham can't bring himself to knock off his third target, former top CIA hit-man Michael Carson (Sterling Hayden). A more vicious and effective hit-man in his day than Cunningham is now, Carson has become so passive, he wouldn't even defend himself.

Ramsey flies to Spain to persuade Cunningham to complete the job, and promises Cunningham that if he does not do so, he will himself be killed, and so will Sheila. Cunningham drives Ramsey, Sheila, Carson, and everyone else who knows about him back down a mountain, and is close to deliberately causing a car crash that would free him for all time, only to relent at the last moment, telling a confused Ramsey afterwards that murder is obsolete. Ramsey is then romanced by Adrianne, much to his bemusement, and it's unclear if he has also weakened in his resolve.

The ending is enigmatic, with Cunningham and Sheila running off together and beginning to make love, as Cunningham tells her that the worst deeds can be done for the best motives. The final image of them narrows to a circle around their heads, reminiscent of the image one would see in a rifle scope.

Cast
 James Coburn as John Cunningham
 Lee Remick as Sheila Metcalfe
 Lilli Palmer as Adrianne
 Burgess Meredith as Ramsey Williams
 Patrick Magee as Alexi
 Sterling Hayden as Michael Carlson
 Claude Dauphin as Maurice
 Helen Cherry as Evelyn Carlson
 Karen Black as Ellen
 Sabine Sun as Belgian Prostitute
 Jo Nupie as Flemish lady
 Miquel Bordoy
 Gerda Marchand
 Vic Moeremans

Production
Producer Marvin Schwartz approached Pogostin, an award-winning TV writer, to see if he was interested in adaptating a story for the screen. Pogostin instead pitched Hard Contract and Schwarz was enthusiastic. Pogostin insisted on directing. Schwartz financed the writing of the script over 15 months.

Box office
According to Fox records the film required $7,200,000 in rentals to break even and by 11 December 1970 had made $3,200,000 so made a loss to the studio.

Subsequent release
Hard Contract was first broadcast on television by ABC in 1974.  It was released on VHS by 20th Century Fox in 1982 in the UK and by Fox Video in 1996 in the United States.

Ster-Kinekor Video and CBS/Fox Video released the film with 20th Century Fox, which was released on VHS in 1990 in South Africa.

See also
 List of American films of 1969

References

External links
 
 
 
 

1969 films
1960s mystery films
20th Century Fox films
American mystery films
American spy films
1960s English-language films
Films scored by Alex North
Films about contract killing
Films about the Central Intelligence Agency
American neo-noir films
1960s American films